Henry Booth, 1st Earl of Warrington (13 January 1652 – 2 January 1694) was a Member of Parliament, Privy Councillor, Protestant protagonist in the Revolution of 1688, Mayor of Chester and author.

Life
Booth was a son of George Booth, Baron Delamer and Lady Elizabeth Grey. His maternal grandparents were Henry Grey, 1st Earl of Stamford and Anne Cecil, daughter of William Cecil, 2nd Earl of Exeter.

Booth served as a Member of Parliament for Cheshire in 1678, 1679 and 1679–1681, and was conspicuous for his opposition to Catholics. On 7 July 1670, he married Mary Langham, daughter of Sir James Langham, 2nd Baronet.

At a treason trial in the House of Lords in January 1685/6, Delamer was accused of participation in the Monmouth Rebellion, and the presiding judge in the case was Judge Jeffreys, as Lord High Steward, sitting with thirty other peers. The defence secured an acquittal.

During the Revolution of 1688, Booth declared in favour of William of Orange, and raised an army in Cheshire in support of him. After William was installed as William III, he made Booth chancellor of the exchequer in 1689. He wrote a number of political tracts, which were published after his death as The Works of the Right Honourable Henry, Late L. Delamer, and Earl of Warrington. He also authored a tract in vindication of his friend, Lord Russel.  He was created Earl of Warrington on 17 April 1690. He became mayor of Chester in October 1691, and died on 2 January 1694.

Wife and children
By his marriage in 1670 to Mary Langham, a daughter of Sir James Langham, 2nd Baronet, Warrington had five children who survived infancy: 
Elizabeth (died 1697)
Mary (1674–1741), who married Russell Robartes and was the mother of Henry Robartes, 3rd Earl of Radnor
George Booth, 2nd Earl of Warrington (1675–1758)
Langham Booth (1684–1724), a Whig member of parliament 
Henry Booth (1687–1726)

Monumental inscriptions
In the Dunham Chancel of the Church of Bowdon is a monument placed between two windows on the south side of the chapel, and divided into two tablets; the first of which is inscribed:

"Beneath lieth the body of the right hon'ble Henry Booth, earl of Warrington, and 
baron Delamer of Dunham Massey, a person of unblemished honour, impartial justice, strict integrity, an illustrious example of steady and unalterable adherence to the liberties and properties of his country in the worst of times, rejecting all offers to allure, and despising all dangers to deter him therefrom, for which he was thrice committed close prisoner to the Tower of London, and at length tried for his life upon a false accusation of high treason, from which he was unanimously acquitted by his peers,
on 14 January, MDCLXXX V/VI which day he afterwards annually commemorated
by acts of devotion and charity: in the year MDCLXXXVIII he greatly signalised himself at the Revolution, on behalf of the protestant religion and the rights of the nation,
without mixture of self-interest, preferring the good of his country to the favour of the prince who then ascended the throne; and having served his generation according to the will of God was gathered to his fathers in peace, on the 2d of January, 169¾, in the XLIId year of his age, whose mortal part was here entombed on the same memorable day on which eight years before his trial had been."

On the other tablet is inscribed:

"Also rest by him the earthly remains of the r. hon'ble Mary countess of Warrington, his wife, sole daughter and heir of sir James Langham, of Cottesbrooke, in the county of Northamptom, [sic] knt. and bart. a lady of ingenious parts, singular discretion,
consummate judgement, great humility, meek and compassionate temper, extensive charity, exemplary and unaffected piety, perfect resignation to God's will, lowly in prosperity and patient in adversity, prudent in her affairs, and endowed with all other virtuous qualities, a conscientious discharger of her duty in all relations, being a faithful, affectionate, and observant, wife, alleviating the cares and afflictions of her husband
by willingly sharing with him therein; a tender, indulgent, and careful mother, a dutiful and respectful daughter, gentle and kind to her servants, courteous and beneficent to her neighbours, a sincere friend, a lover and valuer of all good people,
justly beloved and admired by all who knew her, who having perfected holiness in the fear of God, was by him received to an early and eternal rest from her labours, on 23 March 1690/1, in the XXXVIIth year of her age, calmly and composedly meeting and desiring death with joyful hope and steadfastness of faith, a lively draught of real worth and goodness, and a pattern deserving imitation, of whom the world was not worthy. Heb. XI. 38."

See also
Earl of Warrington
List of deserters from James II to William of Orange

References

1652 births
1694 deaths
Chancellors of the Exchequer of England
English soldiers
Lord-Lieutenants of Cheshire
Members of the Privy Council of England
People of the Rye House Plot
English book and manuscript collectors
People from Altrincham
Henry
Mayors of Chester
English MPs 1661–1679
English MPs 1679
English MPs 1680–1681
English MPs 1681
Earls of Warrington (1690 creation)
2